Yury Valeryevich Mukhin (born August 14, 1971 in Krasnoyarsk, Krasnoyarsk Kray) is a retired Russian freestyle swimmer, who was affiliated with Profsojuzy Samara.

Mukhin is best known for winning the gold medal in the Men's 4 × 200 m Freestyle event at the 1992 Summer Olympics at Barcelona, alongside Vladimir Pyshnenko, Dmitry Lepikov, Veniamin Tayanovich, Aleksey Kudryavtsev (heats) and Yevgeny Sadovyi. He just swam in the preliminary heats.

References 
 

1971 births
Living people
Russian male swimmers
Soviet male swimmers
Olympic swimmers of the Unified Team
Swimmers at the 1992 Summer Olympics
Olympic gold medalists for the Unified Team
Sportspeople from Krasnoyarsk
Russian male freestyle swimmers
World Aquatics Championships medalists in swimming
Medalists at the FINA World Swimming Championships (25 m)
European Aquatics Championships medalists in swimming
Medalists at the 1992 Summer Olympics
Olympic gold medalists in swimming